Chickney is a village and civil parish near Broxted and southwest of Thaxted, in Uttlesford, Essex, England. The parish borders Broxted, Debden, Henham and Thaxted. Chickney just has a parish meeting, there is no parish council. In 2001 the parish had a population of 38.

Landmarks 
There are 10 listed buildings in Chickney. Chickney has a church called St Mary's Church which is Grade I listed and is a redundant church in the care of the Churches Conservation Trust. Sibleys railway station in the parish closed in 1953.

History 
The name origin of Chickney is Uncertain. It could mean 'Chicken island' or possibly, 'Cicca's island'. Chickney was recorded in the Domesday Book as Cicchenai.

See also
 The Hundred Parishes

References

External links 
 https://www.geograph.org.uk/gridref/TL5728
 http://www.recordinguttlesfordhistory.org.uk/chickney/historyofchickney.html

Villages in Essex
Civil parishes in Essex
Uttlesford